The 1993 NatWest Trophy was the 13th NatWest Trophy.  It was an English limited overs county cricket tournament which was held between 22 June and 4 September 1993. The tournament was won by Warwickshire County Cricket Club who defeated Sussex County Cricket Club by 5 wickets in the final at Lord's.

Format
The 18 first-class counties, were joined by twelve Minor Counties:  Buckinghamshire, Cheshire, Devon, Dorset, Hertfordshire, Norfolk, Oxfordshire, Shropshire, Staffordshire, Suffolk, Wales Minor Counties and Wiltshire.  The Ireland national cricket team and the Scotland national cricket team also participated.  Teams who won in the first round progressed to the second round. The winners in the second round then progressed to the quarter-final stage.  Winners from the quarter-finals then progressed to the semi-finals from which the winners then went on to the final at Lord's which was held on 4 September 1993.

First round

Second round

Quarter-finals

Semi-finals

Final

References

External links
CricketArchive tournament page 

Friends Provident Trophy seasons
Natwest Trophy, 1993
NatWest Group